Karsandas Mulji (25 July 183228 August 1871)  was a Gujarati language journalist, writer and social reformer from India. According to 1911 Encyclopædia Britannica  his death occurred in 1875, which may be more likely as it is mentioned that he was appointed to administer a state in Kathiawar in 1874.

Biography 
Born to a family belonging to the Kapol Caste, a trading caste of western India, he was repudiated by his family because of his views on widow remarriage. He became a vernacular schoolmaster and started Satyaprakash, a weekly in Gujarati, in which he attacked what he perceived to be the immoralities of the Maharajas or hereditary high priests of the Pushtimarg Vaishnavism, to which the Bhatias belonged. In a libel suit, the Maharaj Libel Case, brought against him in the High Court at Bombay in 1862, he won a victory on the main issue.

After a visit to England on business in connection with the cotton trade, which was not successful and brought on him excommunication from his caste, he was appointed in 1874 to administer a native state in Kathiawar during the minority of the chief. He died there in August 1875.

Mahipatram Rupram Nilkanth wrote his biography in Gujarati entitled Uttam Kapol Karsandas Mulji Charitra (1877) with an introductory sketch in English. Karsandas Mulji: A Biographical Study (1935) is another critical biography written by B. N. Motiwala.

References

Further reading
 

Journalists from Gujarat
1832 births
1875 deaths
19th-century Indian journalists
19th-century Indian male writers
Gujarati-language writers
People from Surat
Gujaratis from Mumbai